Uroplectes olivaceus is a scorpion of the family Buthidae. The species are 60 mm in length, are black colored, and have fine granulations on their tails. Their venom is not deadly to humans; however, it might cause some swelling.

References

External links
Southern african scorpions

Buthidae
Animals described in 1896
Arthropods of Eswatini